Epistemologia is a biannual peer-reviewed academic journal of philosophy. It is focused on analytical philosophy, publishing articles that deal with philosophy of science, epistemology, logic, philosophy of language, and philosophy of mind. It publishes articles in English and Italian. In 2015 it was reported that the journal had been hijacked.

References

External links
 

Epistemology journals
Multilingual journals
Biannual journals
Hijacked journals